Nafissa Thompson-Spires (born 1983) is an African-American writer. Her first book, Heads of the Colored People, won the Los Angeles Times Art Sidenbaum Award for First Fiction, the PEN Open Book Award, and a Hurston/Wright Award for fiction

Biography
She was born in San Diego, California, in 1983. 
She earned a PhD in English from Vanderbilt University and an MFA in creative writing from University of Illinois and Vanderbilt University.

Her first book, Heads of the Colored People, won the Los Angeles Times Art Sidenbaum Award for First Fiction, the PEN Open Book Award, and a Hurston/Wright Award for fiction, among other prizes. Heads of the Colored People has been translated into Italian, Turkish, and Portuguese.

She also won a 2019 Whiting Award.

Her fiction and creative nonfiction have appeared in New York Magazines “The Cut,” “The Root,” “The Paris Review., “The White Review,” “Ploughshares,” and many other places. Her short piece, “Unbought, Unbossed, Unbothered,” is included in The 1619 Project.

In 2020, she served as a judge for PEN America.

She currently teaches at Cornell University as the Richards Family Assistant Professor of Creative Writing, where she teaches fiction and television studies.

In October of 2018, she appeared on Late Night with Seth Meyers, alongside David Cross and Wanda Sykes.

Works 
 Heads of the Colored People, London: Vintage, 2019.

References

External links 
 INTERVIEW: NAFISSA THOMPSON-SPIRES Midwestern Gothic, 2015

Living people
21st-century American writers
African-American writers
University of Illinois alumni
Vanderbilt University alumni
Cornell University faculty
21st-century American women writers
Writers from San Diego
1983 births